WGVY is an oldies formatted broadcast radio station licensed to Altavista, Virginia, serving Southern Campbell and Northern Pittsylvania counties in Virginia.  WGVY is owned and operated by D.J. Broadcasting, Inc.

Translator
The FM translator operates 24 hours per day from a transmitter site near Lynchburg. The AM signal operates during daytime only.

References

External links

1962 establishments in Virginia
Oldies radio stations in the United States
Radio stations established in 1962
GVY
GVY